This is a list of films produced by the Ollywood film industry based in Bhubaneshwar and Cuttack in 2000:

A-Z

References

2000
Ollywood
 Ollywood
2000s in Orissa
2000 in Indian cinema